Todd Duncan is an American author and motivational speaker. He founded The Duncan Group, a mortgage sales training and consulting company, in 1992.

According to CNN, Duncan is "the Tony Robbins of the mortgage industry." He is the author of 17 books, including the New York Times Bestsellers Time Traps: Proven Strategies for Swamped Sales People and High Trust Selling: Make More Money In Less Time with Less Stress. His newest book, The $6,000 Egg: The 10 New Golden Rules for Customer Service deals with fostering client loyalty and generating sales referrals.

Duncan was listed in the top one-percent of the industry by the time he was age 27. In 1992 he founded The Duncan Group. Duncan is also host of the annual Sales Mastery event, which has been running for 24 years.

Publications
 "The Power To Be Your Best: Creating and Maintaining the Life You Deserve " (Thomas Nelson, 1998)
 "Wealth Strategies: Nine and One Half Steps to Achieving Financial, and Spiritual Abundance" (Thomas Nelson, 2000)
 "Closing The Gap: Over 40 Ways to Get From Where You Are to Where You Want to Be" (Thomas Nelson, 2000)
 "Life by Design: Building the Future of Your Dreams" (Thomas Nelson, 2002)
 "High Trust Selling: Make More Money In Less Time With Less Stress" (Thomas Nelson, 2002)
 "Time Traps: Proven Strategies For Swamped Sales People" (Thomas Nelson, 2004)
 "Time Traps: Proven Strategies For Swamped Business Professionals" (Thomas Nelson, 2004)
 "Sales Motivation: Great Quotes to Fuel Your Passion" (Simple Truths, 2005)
 "Who Stole My Sale: 23 Ways To Close The Deal" (Thomas Nelson, 2006)
 "Killing The Sale: 10 Fatal Mistakes Sales People Make and How to Avoid Them" (Thomas Nelson, 2007)
 "Life On The Wire: Avoid Burnout and Succeed In Work and Life" (Thomas Nelson, 2010)
 "The $6,000 Egg: The 10 New Golden Rules Of Customer Service" (Simple Truths, 2015)
 "5 Stars: Building High Ratings and High Trust in the Digital Age" (Simple Truths, 2016)
 "10 Golden Rules of Customer Service" (Sourcebooks, 2019)

References

External links
http://www.toddduncan.com/
http://www.salesmasteryevent.com/

Date of birth missing (living people)
American male writers
Living people
Year of birth missing (living people)